Songe is a village in Tvedestrand municipality in Agder county, Norway.

References

Villages in Agder
Tvedestrand